DHH can refer to:

 David Heinemeier Hansson, a Danish computer programmer
 Deaf and hard of hearing
 Desert hedgehog (protein), a protein encoded by the Dhh gene
 DHH phosphatase family
 Louisiana Department of Health and Hospitals
 Dhh, a 2017 Indian children's film